The 2009–10 Setanta Sports Cup was the 5th staging of the cross-border Setanta Sports Cup competition - which features football clubs from the Republic of Ireland and Northern Ireland. It commenced on August 28, 2009, and the final was played on May 15, 2010, with Bohemians defeating St Patrick's Athletic 1–0 to claim their first Setanta Cup triumph.

On June 22, 2009, the draw for the competition was postponed because of the financial troubles of organizer Setanta Sports. However, on July 19, 2009, it was confirmed that the competition would be going ahead as planned, and the draw was made at FAI headquarters in Abbotstown, Dublin, on July 28.

Changes to structure

In the 2009–10 season, the Setanta Cup was expanded to nine teams, comprising three groups of three. The three group winners qualified for the semi-finals, as did the group runner-up with the best record. Teams were drawn from the top four of both leagues, with an additional place for the winners of the previous competition, Cork City. In a further change to the format of previous years, games were expected to take place on weekends instead of midweek.

Group stages

Teams that progressed to the semi-finals are indicated in bold type.

Teams eliminated from the Setanta Sports Cup this stage are indicated in italics.

Group 1

Postponed due to waterlogged pitch

Due to Cork City's resignation from the competition, Sligo Rovers were awarded a 3-0 win

Due to Cork City's resignation from the competition, Cliftonville were awarded a 3-0 win

Group 2

Group 3

Derry City ceased to exist, St Patrick's Athletic awarded 3-0 win

Derry City ceased to exist, Linfield awarded 3-0 win

Semi finals

|}

First leg

Second leg

St Patrick's Athletic won 6 − 2 on aggregate

Bohemians won 3 − 1 on aggregate

Final

Goalscorers
2 goals

  Darren Boyce (Coleraine)
  Paul Byrne (St Patrick's Athletic)
  Raffaele Cretaro (Bohemians)
  Paddy Madden (Bohemians)
  Dean Marshall (Sligo Rovers)
  Rob Turner (Sligo Rovers)
  Andrew Waterworth (Glentoran)

1 goal

  Pádraig Amond (Sligo Rovers)
  Jason Bannon (Cliftonville)
  Liam Boyce (Cliftonville)
  Jason Byrne (Bohemians)
  Gareth Coughlan (St Patrick's Athletic)
  Paul Deasy (Cork City)
  Mark Doninger (Sligo Rovers)
  Eoin Doyle (Sligo Rovers)
  Jim Ervin (Linfield)
  Daryl Fordyce (Glentoran)
  Joe Gamble (Cork City)
  Ryan Guy (St Patrick's Athletic)
  Andrew Hall (Glentoran)
  Gary Hamilton (Glentoran)
  Owen Heary (Bohemians)
  John Lester (St Patrick's Athletic)
  Damian Lynch (St Patrick's Athletic)
  David McAllister (St Patrick's Athletic)
  Mark McAllister (Linfield)
  Jason McGuinness (Bohemians)
  Tam McManus (Derry City)
  Paul Munster (Linfield)
  Anto Murphy (Bohemians)
  Conor O'Grady (Sligo Rovers)
  Ken Oman (Bohemians)
  Rory Patterson (Coleraine)
  Mark Rossiter (Bohemians)
  Richie Ryan (Sligo Rovers)
  Guntars Silagailis (Cork City)
  Thomas Stewart (Derry City)
  Peter Thompson (Linfield)
  Danny Ventre (Sligo Rovers)
  Alex Williams (St Patrick's Athletic)

References

2009–10
1
1
2009–10 in Northern Ireland association football